Zhuge Xuan (died  February 197) was a government official who lived during the late Eastern Han dynasty of China. He is best known for briefly serving as the Administrator of Yuzhang Commandery (around present-day Nanchang, Jiangxi) in the mid-190s. He was also a cousin-uncle (first/second cousin once removed) of Zhuge Liang, a prominent statesman of the state of Shu Han during the Three Kingdoms period.

Life
Zhuge Xuan was from Yangdu County, Langya Commandery, which is located in present-day Yinan County or Yishui County, Shandong. His ancestor, Zhuge Feng, was a Western Han dynasty official who served as Colonel-Director of Retainers under Emperor Yuan (48–33 BCE). One of his cousins, Zhuge Gui, served as an assistant official in Taishan Commandery (泰山郡; around present-day Tai'an, Shandong) during the late Eastern Han dynasty under Emperor Ling (168–189 CE).

As Zhuge Gui and his wife died early, Zhuge Xuan raised their two younger sons, Zhuge Liang and Zhuge Jun. Sometime in the mid-190s, the warlord Yuan Shu appointed Zhuge Xuan as the Administrator of Yuzhang Commandery (豫章郡; around present-day Nanchang, Jiangxi). Zhuge Xuan brought Zhuge Liang and Zhuge Jun with him to Yuzhang Commandery and wanted to appoint them as his subordinates. Around 195, However, he soon left Yuzhang Commandery when the Han central government officially designated Zhu Hao as the new Administrator. Zhuge Xuan then brought Zhuge Liang and Zhuge Jun to Jing Province (covering present-day Hubei and Hunan) to live with his friend Liu Biao, who was also Jing Province's governor. After Zhuge Xuan's death, Zhuge Liang and Zhuge Jun moved to Longzhong, an area about 20 li west of Xiangyang, the capital of Jing Province.
The Xiandi Chunqiu by Yuan Wei recorded a completely different account about Zhuge Xuan. It mentioned that Liu Biao – instead of Yuan Shu – appointed Zhuge Xuan as the Administrator of Yuzhang Commandery to replace the previous Administrator, Zhou Shu, who died in office. However, the Han central government, upon receiving news of Zhou Shu's death, appointed Zhu Hao as the new Administrator. As Zhuge Xuan was reluctant to transfer power to Zhu Hao, the latter allied with Liu Yao, the Inspector of Yang Province, to attack him. Zhuge Xuan retreated to Xicheng County (西城縣; south of present-day Chongren County, Jiangxi) after he lost Yuzhang Commandery's capital, Nanchang. In February 197, the people in Xicheng County rebelled against Zhuge Xuan, killed him and sent his head to Liu Yao.

The Zizhi Tongjian by Sima Guang endorsed the Xiandi Chunqiu account up to the point where Zhu Hao allied with Liu Yao to force Zhuge Xuan out of Yuzhang Commandery. It does not confirm that Zhuge Xuan died in Xicheng County in February 197.

See also
 Lists of people of the Three Kingdoms

Notes

References

 Chen, Shou (3rd century). Records of the Three Kingdoms (Sanguozhi).
 
 Pei, Songzhi (5th century). Annotations to Records of the Three Kingdoms (Sanguozhi zhu).
 Sima, Guang (1084). Zizhi Tongjian.

Year of birth unknown
Year of death unknown
3rd-century deaths
Han dynasty politicians
People during the end of the Han dynasty
Political office-holders in Jiangxi
Executed Han dynasty people
People executed by the Han dynasty